Appanoose was a 19th-century Meskwaki chief who lived in Iowa; he was son of Taimah (Chief Tama) and probably a grandson of Quashquame. Prior to European-American settlement in the 19th century, the tribe occupied territory in what became Michigan, Wisconsin, Illinois and Iowa. 

Several place names and a US Navy ship honored Appanoose:
Appanoose County, Iowa
Appanoose County Courthouse
Appanoose County Community Railroad
Appanoose Township, Franklin County, Kansas
Appanoose Township, Hancock County, Illinois
USS Appanoose (AK-226), a Crater class cargo ship

References

Native American history of Iowa
Native American leaders
19th-century Native Americans
People from Iowa